SS Ardmore was a British cargo ship that was torpedoed by  in St. George's Channel  west south west of the Coningbeg Lightship on 13 November 1917 while carrying general cargo from London, United Kingdom to Cork, Ireland.

Construction 
Ardmore was built at the Caledon Shipbuilding & Engineering Co. Ltd. shipyard in Dundee, United Kingdom in 1909. She was launched and completed that same year. The ship could reach a maximum speed of 12.5 knots.

Sinking 
Ardmore left London bound for Cork carrying general cargo. When she was 13 miles west south west from Coningbeg Lightship in the St. George's Channel on 13 November 1917 she was torpedoed and sunk without warning by the German submarine . Of the 27 crew on board, only eight were rescued.

References

1909 ships
Cargo ships of the United Kingdom
Ships built in Dundee
World War I ships
World War I shipwrecks in the Irish Sea
Maritime incidents in 1917
Ships sunk by German submarines in World War I
Shipwrecks in the Irish Sea
World War I ships of the United Kingdom
Steamships of the United Kingdom